Advancer may refer to:
a person or thing that advances
the partner of an overcaller in contact bridge
a forward-pointing branch of an antler
a brand name for trailers produced by the Sunline Coach Company in the 2000s
a piece in the Rococo variation of Baroque chess
"The Advancer" ("La Avanzadora"), nickname of Juana Ramírez, a female participant in the 1813 Battle of Alto de los Godos

See also
Advancer Tina, a 1996 anime on the list of titles by Green Bunny